Mustilizans is a genus of moths of the family Endromidae described by Ji-Kun Yang in 1995. The genus was previously placed in the subfamily Prismostictinae of the family Bombycidae.

Species
Subgenus Mustilizans
Mustilizans baishanzua Yang, 1995 (misspelled beishanzuna)
Mustilizans capella Zolotuhin, 2007
Mustilizans dierli (Holloway, 1987)
Mustilizans drepaniformis J. K. Yang, 1995
Mustilizans eitschbergeri Zolotuhin, 2007
Mustilizans hepatica (Moore, 1879)
Mustilizans lepusa Zolotuhin, 2007
Mustilizans predicta Zolotuhin, 2007
Mustilizans shennongi Yang & Mao, 1995
Mustilizans sinjaevi Zolotuhin, 2007
Subgenus Promustilia Zolotuhin, 2007
Mustilizans andracoides Zolotuhin, 2007

References

 
Endromidae